The Dartmouth Medal of the American Library Association is awarded annually to a reference work of outstanding quality and significance, published during the previous calendar year.

History
Dartmouth College sponsored the establishment of the award in 1974, acting on the recommendation of Dean Lathem,  Dartmouth College librarian, who had noted that no special honor existed in the United States for distinguished achievement relating to the creation of works of reference resources centrally important to libraries and to the pursuit of learning. Dartmouth College gave the American Library Association complete control in making the award and commissioned the artist Rudolph Ruzicka to design an oval bronze medal that features Athena, goddess of wisdom.

Dartmouth Medal recipients

Sources
 American Library Association Reference and User Services Association

External links
ALA RUSA Dartmouth Medal
 American Library Association, Reference and Users Services Association

Awards established in 1974
American Library Association awards
American non-fiction literary awards
Dartmouth College
English-language literary awards